Miss Saint Lucia or Miss Saint Lucia Universe is a national Beauty pageant in Saint Lucia where the winner is sent to Miss Universe. The current Miss Saint Lucia 2022 is Sheris Paul of Castries.

History
Saint Lucia owned national winner in 1975 when Sophia St. Omer crowned as the first Miss Saint Lucia winner in history. Under the Ministry of Tourism Saint Lucia, in 1977 the Miss Saint Lucia Organization sent the winner to Miss Universe 1977.

The Miss Saint Lucia Organization deeply holds empowerment programs during years:
 Student Experiences and Mentorship Programs
 Little Sista's Programme

Franchise ownership
 Ministry of Tourism Saint Lucia (1977 & 2011–2014)
 Joan Johnson (Joan Laurencin) (2006–2007)
 Joycie Mederick (Cinnamon Productions) (2017–present)

Titleholders
The following is a list of all Miss Saint Lucia titleholders since 1975:

Titleholders under Miss Saint Lucia org.

Miss Universe Saint Lucia

Miss Saint Lucia has started to send a Miss Saint Lucia to Miss Universe from 1977. On occasion, when the winner does not qualify (due to age) for either contest, a runner-up is sent.

References

External links
misssaintlucia.org

Beauty pageants in Saint Lucia
Entertainment events in Saint Lucia
Recurring events established in 1975
1975 establishments in Saint Lucia